This is a list of singles that have peaked in the Top 10 of the Billboard Hot 100 during 1969.

Creedence Clearwater Revival, The Beatles, The Temptations, and Diana Ross & the Supremes each had four top-ten hits in 1969, tying them for the most top-ten hits during the year.

Top-ten singles

† — "Get Back" also made its Hot 100 debut on May 10.

1968 peaks

1970 peaks

See also
 1969 in music
 List of Hot 100 number-one singles of 1969 (U.S.)

References

General sources

Joel Whitburn Presents the Billboard Hot 100 Charts: The Sixties
Joel Whitburn Presents the Billboard Hot 100 Charts: The Seventies
Additional information obtained can be verified within Billboard's online archive services and print editions of the magazine.

1969
United States Hot 100 Top 10